Herman Renting (born December 31, 1969) is a Dutch mixed martial artist. He competed in the Heavyweight division.

Mixed martial arts record

|-
| Loss
| align=center| 1-3
| Piet van Gammeren
| Decision (unanimous)
| Rings Holland: Heroes Live Forever
| 
| align=center| 2
| align=center| 5:00
| Utrecht, Netherlands
| 
|-
| Loss
| align=center| 1-2
| Akira Shoji
| Submission (armbar)
| Pride 11 - Battle of the Rising Sun
| 
| align=center| 1
| align=center| 3:48
| Osaka, Japan
| 
|-
| Win
| align=center| 1-1
| David Levicki
| Decision (unanimous)
| Rings Holland: Free Fight
| 
| align=center| 1
| align=center| 10:00
| Amsterdam, North Holland, Netherlands
| 
|-
| Loss
| align=center| 0-1
| David Khakhaleishvili
| N/A
| Rings: Budokan Hall 1995
| 
| align=center| 0
| align=center| 0:00
| Tokyo, Japan
|

See also
List of male mixed martial artists

References

External links
 
 Herman Renting at mixedmartialarts.com

1969 births
Living people
Dutch male mixed martial artists
Heavyweight mixed martial artists
Mixed martial artists utilizing kickboxing
Mixed martial artists utilizing sambo
Dutch sambo practitioners
Dutch male professional wrestlers
Place of birth missing (living people)
Sportspeople from Amsterdam